The Central Orsha-Khingan Order of Zhukov Red Banner National Guard District is a regional district of the National Guard Forces Command, National Guard of Russia. It is headquartered in Moscow and under the command of Colonel General Aleksandr Popov (:ru:Попов, Александр Анатольевич). General Popov was appointed to the post by a Ukaz of 30 July 2021.

The district traces its heraldic descent to the 192nd Rifle Division (2nd formation) (:ru:192-я стрелковая дивизия (2-го формирования)) of the Red Army of the World War II, which became 76th Orsha-Khingan Red Banner Convoy Division of the escort forces of the MVD USSR in 1945–46.

History 
The district traces its heraldic descent to the 192nd Rifle Division (2nd formation) of the Red Army of the World War II, which became 76th Orsha-Khingan Red Banner Convoy Division of the escort forces of the MVD USSR in 1945–46.

Red Army service: 192nd Rifle Division (Second Formation) 
The second formation of the 192nd Rifle Division was formed on 20 May 1943, as part of the Western Front. The 192nd Rifle Division was established by merging the 64th Division (Second formation) and 112th independent Rifle Brigade. The division was formed in the vicinity of the village of Svinoroyka, Sychevsky district, Smolensk Oblast.

Since 7 August 1943, the division took part in offensive battles for the villages of Rysava, Rechitsa, Terentyevo, Nikolskoye, Shimeni and Yushkovo of the Smolensk region during the Smolensk operation, as part of the 68th Army of the Western Front. On September 25, 1943, the division distinguished itself during the Battle of Smolensk, when the city was retaken from the Germans. From October 1943 to 28 January 1944 - in active defense at the turn of Rossosna - Bobrov.

Since 23 April it became subordinate to the 31st Army as part of the 3rd Belorussian Front and took up defense at the Olkhovka, Osinstroy line.

Divisional Assignments during the Second World War

MVD SSSR service: Internal Troops division 
In 1945-46 the 192nd Rifle Division became 1st Department for Escort and Protection of the Internal Troops of the Soviet Union (VV MVD SSSR), located in Moscow.

On 6 May 1951, the NKVD escort division was reorganized into the 1st Orsha-Khingan Red Banner Department of the Ministry of Internal Affairs of the Moscow Region. On 15 December 1968, the 1st Department became the 36th Convoy Orsha-Khingan Red Banner Division of the Internal Troops.

MVD SSSR service: administration 
On 7 May 1986 the division was reorganised and expanded into the Orshansko-Khinganskaya Red Banner Central Administration Internal Troops MVD SSSR, located in Moscow (Military Unit Number 7554). From that point in time the 43rd Convoy Division of the MVD in Minsk was attached to the Central Administration.

In 1990 the district's troops included:
 43rd Convoy Division;
 32nd Convoy Brigade;
 499th, 501st, 503rd, 507th, 587th, 597th, 638th, 667th Convoy Regiments;
 504th Training Regiment, Sofrino;
 13th, 50th Special Motorised Militia Battalions (OMON) 
 444th Independent Convoy Battalion, Ryazan

In 1989 the 3rd Special Motorised Militia Regiment of the Dzerzhinsky Division was reorganised as the separate 23rd Special Motorised Militia Brigade.

MVD RF service 
With the dissolution of the Soviet Union the district became part of the reduced Internal Troops of Russia in 1991–92. In January 1993, the Moscow Orsha-Khingansky Red Banner District of the Internal Troops of the Ministry of Internal Affairs of Russia was formed. Combat troops subordinated to the Moscow District carried out combat missions throughout the two wars in the North Caucasus - the First and Second Chechen Wars.

Reportedly in 1999 the 23rd Special Motorised Militia Brigade was expanded into the 55th Division of the VV.

In 2008, the Moscow District was transformed into the Central Regional Command of the Internal Troops of the Ministry of Internal Affairs of Russia.

In 2013, in Russian service, the district included the Special Designation Division; three other VV divisions; a special designation brigade; five regiments; three special designation detachments (Peresvet, Scythian, and Merkury) the 102nd, 104th, 109th, 107th, and 681st Special Mobile Police Battalions, all in Moscow; the 128th Special Mobile Police Battalion (Voronezh); the 547th Special Mobile Police Battalion (Elektrostal), the 414th Independent Special Mobile Police Battalion (Yaroslavl); the 423rd Independent SMBP (Lyubertsy); the 597th SMBP at Kursk; the 667th SMBP at Tula; the 129th SMBP at Lipetsk; two other SMBPs, including one at Tver; and a total of three other SMBPs, and eight VV battalions.

National Guard of Russia 
Along with the rest of the Russian Internal Troops, the personnel, equipment, and infrastructure of the district became part of the new National Guard of Russia when the Internal Troops were dissolved and reorganised in mid-2016.

List of commanders 
Since 2016, the Central Orsha-Khingan Red Banner National Guard District has had two Commanders:
 Colonel general Igor Golloyev:  6 December 2017 - 30 July 2021;
 Colonel general Aleksandr Popov: 30 July 2021 – present.

Organization 
The Central Orsha-Khingan Red Banner National Guard District is in charge for 18 Federal subjects of Russia, each of them having a dedicated National Guard command. Both Moscow and Moscow Oblast have a Main Directorate each, while other Oblasts have Directorates. The Central District also has at its disposal:
 Separate Operational Purpose Division
 12th, 55th, 95th Divisions of VV (as of 2013)
 21st operational brigade; (as of 2013)
 Special rapid response units;
 Mobile special units;
 Licensing and permit work and private security units (distinct from the territorial organization);
 Special motorized military units;
 Military units for the protection of important state facilities;
 Special cargo, aviation, marine and others military formations.

Awards and decorations

Notes

References 
  (see Mark Galeotti)
 
 

Units and formations of the National Guard of Russia
Military districts of the Russian Federation
Law enforcement units
Ministry of Internal Affairs (Soviet Union)
Military units and formations established in 1986